Zelenikovo may refer to the following places:

Bulgaria
 Zelenikovo, Kardzhali Province
 Zelenikovo, Plovdiv Province

North Macedonia
 Zelenikovo, North Macedonia
 Zelenikovo Municipality